Kevin Huezo (born July 21, 1991 in California, USA) is an American professional footballer who plays for Murciélagos  of Ascenso MX.

External links
Liga MX

Liga MX players
Living people
1991 births
Sportspeople from California
Mexican footballers

Association footballers not categorized by position
American expatriate soccer players
21st-century American people